Lake Visaginas is located south of the town of Visaginas in eastern Lithuania.

References

Lakes of Lithuania
Visaginas Municipality